This Is Country Music is the ninth studio album by American country music artist Brad Paisley. The album was originally scheduled to be released April 19, but was pushed back to May 23, 2011 by recording label Arista Nashville.

Content
Brad Paisley debuted the title track from the album on the 44th CMA Awards on November 10, 2010, and he received a standing ovation. This performance got Brad's fans excited for the release of his new album.

Brad Paisley wrote this album to pay tribute to various artists that have shaped his career. This includes Dick Dale for the song "Working on a Tan" and Ennio Morricone for the song "Eastwood". The majority of the songs were written or co-written by Brad Paisley, and are based on the themes of love, loss, hope, and heartache.<ref>{{cite magazine|last=Price|first=Deborah|title=Brad Paisley'This Is Country Music:Track by Track Review|url=http://www.billboard.com/articles/news/471162/brad-paisley-this-is-country-music-track-by-track-review|magazine=Billboard|accessdate=27 October 2011}}</ref> The title track, This Is Country Music, starts off the album, and small verses of that song, that were not included in the original track, act as interludes between some of the songs. This ties the album to a common theme.

The album contains numerous collaborations with other artists, including Don Henley, Sheryl Crow, Blake Shelton, and Marty Stuart.  Carrie Underwood also performs a duet titled "Remind Me", which is about a couple trying to regain their spark.  Clint Eastwood contributes by whistling during an instrumental track called "Eastwood", which is named after him. Comedian Larry the Cable Guy uses his catchphrase "Git-R-Done" several times in the background, during the song "Camouflage". It was announced at Sony's annual boat show Country Radio Seminar that Brad would  collaborate  with Alabama for the song titled "Old Alabama" The song was the second single from the album. "Old Alabama" became the 19th #1 single for Brad  The song was released to country radio on March 14, 2011. The third single, "Remind Me", is a  duet with fellow country singer Carrie Underwood. The song hit number one and also became Paisley's biggest crossover hit, reaching number 17 on the all genres Billboard Hot 100 chart. "Camouflage" was released as the album fourth single. The song peaked at  number 15 on Hot Country Songs chart,  becoming Paisley's first single to miss the top 10 since Me Neither peaked at number 18 in mid 2000.

Reception

CommercialThis Is Country Music debuted at number two on the U.S. Billboard 200, and sold 153,000 copies in the first week of release. Keith Caulfield with Billboard magazine noted that Paisley was at a disadvantage releasing the album the same week as Lady Gaga's Born This Way, which was expected to sell up to one million copies. Cualfield stated, "With all this talk about Gaga, you've got to feel a little bad for country superstar Brad Paisley, whose This Is Country Music album will likely debut in the runner-up slot next week with maybe 150,000 copies sold. Paisley has yet to earn a No. 1 album -- after six top 10s, two of which hit No. 2. (Had his new album come a week earlier, perhaps he could have secured his first No. 1.)" As of  November 23, 2011, the album has sold 561,000 copies in the US.

Critical

Upon its release, This Is Country Music received critical acclaim from music critics. At Metacritic, which assigns a normalized rating out of 100 to reviews from mainstream critics, the album received an average score of 82, based on 11 reviews. This indicates "universal acclaim". Chris Willman of Entertainment Weekly gave the release an 'A'. He  stated that "the whole record plays like a best-of sampler — not just for Paisley, but for the history of the art form". Jody Rosen of The New York Times was in high praise of the album, saying "Mr. Paisley is once again preaching to his choir. It’s a bright, brisk record, packed with the polished country-pop songs that Mr. Paisley’s devotees have come to expect. It’s a study in the politics of 21st-century Nashville stardom, the delicate maneuvering that a performer like Mr. Paisley must do to keep his pews filled. But listen closely and you hear some surprises — and a more expansive definition of country music than the album’s title track at first suggests". In his consumer guide for MSN Music, critic Robert Christgau complimented Paisley's songcraft as "undiminished [...] he remains the smartest and nicest guy in his world", and gave the album an A− rating. indicating "the kind of garden-variety good record that is the great luxury of musical micromarketing and overproduction". Robert Silva of About.com  gave the album four stars out of five and wrote that it "aims to cover all its musical bases", which is done with some "clever songwriting". In USA Today, Brian Mansfield gave it a positive review, and evoked how Paisley "set[s] a high standard" for himself, which the album is "steeped in the past and looking for ways to grow", and told "that it lives up to its title as well as any album in recent memory."

Jonathan Keefe of Slant Magazine called the album less satisfying than Paisley's previous albums, saying the album "threatens to become a great country album instead of an album simply about great country music. That's a distinction Paisley has gotten right more often than not over the course of his career [...] But even when the album isn't up to Paisley's typical standards, This Is Country Music is still an interesting, ambitious project from a man who need not apologize for the things he does awfully well."  Giving it four stars out of five, Jessica Phillips of Country Weekly magazine praised the album's "traditional" sound and variety of songs. She also thought that the album's more comedic songs provided a "humorous equilibrium[…]without being relentlessly clever." Rolling Stone critic Will Hermes gave the album a 3½ star rating. Hermes thought the album "embraces all of what country music is today — its soul, its vivid storytelling, and, yes, its genre clichés. The lead singles, uncharacteristically, are ads more than songs;  Elsewhere, the greatest country artist of his generation keeps it fresh, funny and guitar-heroic". Stuart Munro of The Boston Globe gave it a favorable review, saying "'This Is Country Music' encapsulates Paisley’s status as a premier upholder of traditional country within a contemporary framework, and the 15 songs that follow confirm that status; The sentiment here isn’t prescriptive but descriptive, in the self-referential manner that frequents today’s country [...] Yes, this is country music". At The Guardian, Angus Batey of The Guardian said that Paisley "has fun with country's cliches, but still treats the genre seriously", which is why "he remains the Nashville mainstream's most potent ambassador."

Stephen Thomas Erlewine from Allmusic gave it a favorable review. Erelwine stated that "Paisley narrows his definition of what constitutes modern country on his seventh collection of new songs [..] here’s where Paisley’s skills as a craftsman come into play. Always a traditionalist, he builds a song with care but is keenly aware that he’s living in 2011, not 1965". Emily Yahr of The Washington Post gave the release a favorable review, saying "While it’s an enjoyable listen, there are no real surprises — at this point, Paisley knows what works. Dan MacIntosh of Roughstock gave the album a four star rating. He believes that "buying new music can sometimes be a gamble. However, Brad Paisley is the closest artist to a sure thing that you’ll likely find. This is country music – at its best". Randy Lewis of the Los Angeles Times gave it a 2½ out of 4 star rating, calling a lot of the material "overworked". Lewis explained that "[Brad's] skills as a songwriter, guitarist extraordinaire and distinctively expressive singer are obvious at many turns on his latest album. But on this outing Paisley doesn’t move the musical conversation forward the way he’s done in several previous albums". Deborah Evans Price of Billboard called the album "musically diverse" and commented by saying that "vocally, Paisley has never sounded better, and the ace guitar player struts his stuff throughout, skillfully complementing the mood and timbre of each tune. Country music's most talented young ambassador has delivered the ultimate love letter to his art form with This is Country Music".

Track listing

Personnel
Credits for This Is Country Music'' adapted from Allmusic.

Musicians

 Robert Arthur – acoustic guitar
 Carrie Bailey – violin
 Jim "Moose" Brown – Hammond B3, keyboards, piano, vocal group
 Jeff Cook – rhythm guitar, vocals
 Susanna Cranford – vocal group
 Sheryl Crow – background vocals
 Randle Currie – steel guitar, vocal group
 Eric Darken – percussion
 David Davidson – violin
 Chris Dowis – vocal group
 Clint Eastwood – whistle
 Connie Ellisor – violin
 Teddy Gentry – vocals
 Kevin Grantt – upright bass
 Jim Grosjean – viola
 Erin Hall – violin
 Tania Hancheroff – background vocals
 Don Henley – background vocals
 Wes Hightower – background vocals
 Gary Hooker – acoustic and rhythm guitar
 Sonya Isaacs – background vocals
 Carl Jackson – banjo, background vocals
 Mike Johnson – dobro

 Anthony LaMarchina – cello
 Betsy Lamb – viola
 Larry the Cable Guy – vocal group
 Kendall Marcy – banjo, mando, overdub engineer, vocal group
 Carl Marsh – string arrangements
 Gordon Mote – Hammond B3, piano, wurlitzer
 Kimberly Mote – vocal group
 Samantha Mote – vocal group
 Mary Kathryn Van Osdale – violin
 Randy Owen – rhythm guitar, vocals
 Brad Paisley – lead vocals, lead guitar, acoustic guitar
 Huck Paisley – vocals
 Jasper Paisley – vocals
 Sari Reist – cello
 Ben Sesar – drums, vocal group
 Pam Sixfin – violin
 Marty Stuart – mandolin, background vocals
 Russell Terrell – background vocals
 Carrie Underwood – duet
 Chad Weaver – vocal group
 Justin Williamson – fiddle, vocal group
 Karen Winkelmann – string contractor

Technical

 Jeff Balding – overdub engineer
 Brady Barnett – digital editing
 Richard Barrow – digital editing, engineer, overdub engineer, vocal group
 Tracy Baskette-Fleaner – art direction, package design
 Drew Bollman – overdub engineer
 Neal Cappellino – digital editing, overdub engineer
 Jim Catino – A&R
 Tammie Harris Cleek – imaging, photo production
 Judy Forde-Blair – creative producer, liner notes
 Jennifer Kemp – stylist
 Jason Lehning – overdub engineer
 Scott McDaniel – cover design, creative director

 Tyler Moles – digital editing
 Rich Ramsey – assistant
 Lowell Reynolds – assistant
 Mellissa Schleicher – grooming
 David Schoeber – engineer
 Jim Shea – photography
 Phillip Stein – digital editing, production assistant
 Hank Williams – mastering
 Brian Willis – digital editing
 Brian David Willis – engineer, overdub engineer, vocal group
 Luke Wooten – mixing

Charts and certifications

Weekly charts

Year-end charts

Certifications

Singles

References

2011 albums
Brad Paisley albums
Arista Records albums
Albums produced by Frank Rogers (record producer)